Love & Negotiation is the third studio album by Canadian country music singer-songwriter Carolyn Dawn Johnson. It was released on June 7, 2006, by Angeline Entertainment in Canada. In addition, it was originally scheduled to be released in the United States in mid-2007 by Equity Music Group but was delayed and Johnson exited Equity in 2008. The album was released in the United States digitally through Dancing Lily Music on October 13, 2009, with different artwork.

Track listing
 "Love & Negotiation" (Carolyn Dawn Johnson, Bobby Pinson) – 4:03
 "Taking Back My Brave" (Johnson, Sunny Russ) – 3:55
 "Got a Good Day" (Johnson, Kylie Sackley) – 3:59
 "Thinkin' Things" (Johnson, Tom Shapiro) – 3:59
 "Everybody's Favourite/Favorite" (Johnson) – 3:36
 "Dreaming Without You" (Johnson, Billy Kirsch) – 3:55
 "Crybaby" (Johnson, Gordie Sampson, Troy Verges) – 4:16
 "Little Breakdowns" (Johnson, Jeffrey Steele) – 3:42
 "All You Need to Know" (Johnson, Matraca Berg) – 3:55
 "Into You" (Johnson, Mary Danna, Shaye Smith) – 3:45
 "Nothing Good About Lonely" (Johnson, Danna) – 4:07
 "Got There First" (Johnson, Danna) – 3:56

Personnel

 Tim Akers – keyboards, Hammond organ, piano
 Steve Bryant – bass guitar
 Tom Bukovac – electric guitar
 Dennis Burnside – Fender Rhodes
 Park Chisolm – bass guitar
 Eric Darken – chimes, gong, drum loops, percussion, shaker, sleigh bells, tambourine, vibraphone
 Dan Dugmore – steel guitar, lap steel guitar
 Larry Franklin – mandolin
 Tony Harrell – Hammond organ, Wurlitzer
 Dann Huff – electric guitar
 Carolyn Dawn Johnson – acoustic guitar, piano, lead vocals, background vocals
 Troy Lancaster – electric guitar
 Steve Mandile – electric guitar, slide guitar
 Jeff Marino – drums
 Greg Morrow – drums
 Brian K. Nutter – electric guitar
 Jimmy Rankin – background vocals
 Gordie Sampson – background vocals
 Scotty Sanders – steel guitar
 Keith Sewell – acoustic guitar
 Jeffrey Steele – background vocals
 Bryan Sutton – bouzouki, 12-string acoustic guitar
 Scott Williamson – drums
 Glenn Worf – bass guitar
 Jonathan Yudkin – cello, dobro, fiddle, mandolin, violin, viola

Singles chronology

Canada
 Crybaby (2006)
 Taking Back My Brave (2006)
 Into You (2007)

United States
 Taking Back My Brave (2006)
 Love & Negotiation (2006)
 Got a Good Day (2007)

2006 albums
Equity Music Group albums
Carolyn Dawn Johnson albums
Albums produced by Dann Huff